Rebecca Meder (born 31 July 2002) is a South African swimmer. She is the African record holder in the 100 metre individual medley and the South African record holder in the long course and short course 200 metre individual medley. At the 2022 World Short Course Championships, she placed sixth in the final of the 100 metre individual medley. In the 200 metre individual medley at the 2022 Commonwealth Games, she placed fourth in the final. At the 2021 African Championships, she won 11 gold medals, six in individual events and five in relay events, swimming on the finals relay for each of the five relay events.

Career
Meder qualified to compete at the 2018 World Short Course Championships in the 200 metre individual medley when she was 16 years old. She competed in the women's 200 metre freestyle at the 2019 World Aquatics Championships. In 2021, she represented South Africa at the 2020 Summer Olympics held in Tokyo, Japan. Following the Olympic Games, she returned to international competition in October at the 2021 African Swimming Championships in Accra, Ghana, winning a total of eleven gold medals, six in the individual events 100 metre freestyle, 200 metre freestyle, 100 metre backstroke, 200 metre backstroke, 200 metre individual medley, 400 metre individual medley, and five as a finals relay member in the 4×100 metre freestyle relay, 4×200 metre freestyle relay, 4×100 metre medley relay, 4×100 metre mixed freestyle relay, and 4×100 metre mixed medley relay.

2022
From her performances at the 2022 South Africa National Swimming Championships, Meder was named to the South Africa team for the 2022 World Aquatics Championships in the 100 metre backstroke, 200 metre individual medley, and 400 metre individual medley. She did not enter to compete in the events at the Championships. In June, she was named to the South Africa team for the 2022 Commonwealth Games.

2022 Commonwealth Games
Meder placed ninth in the 400 metre individual medley at the 2022 Commonwealth Games, held in Birmingham, England, with a time of 4:51.65. The following day, she finished fourth in her preliminaries heat in the 100 metre backstroke and qualified for the semifinals. She qualified for the final in the evening semifinals. For the preliminaries of the 50 metre butterfly on day three, she tied Quah Ting Wen of Singapore for eleventh-rank with a time of 27.16 seconds and qualified for the semifinals. Later in the day, she placed eleventh in the semifinals with a time of 26.84 seconds and did not qualify for the final. Approximately 90 minutes later, she placed seventh in the final of the 100 metre backstroke.

On the fourth day of competition, Meder ranked second in the preliminaries of the 200 metre individual medley with a 2:12.57, which was 0.45 seconds behind first-ranked Summer McIntosh of Canada, and qualified for the semifinals. She placed fourth in the final, finishing less than a second and a half behind bronze medalist Abbie Wood of England with a South African record time of 2:12.01. The following day, she started with a time of 29.55 seconds in the 50 metre backstroke preliminaries, qualifying for the semifinals ranking thirteenth. Later in the morning, she helped qualify the 4×100 metre mixed medley relay to the final ranking fourth, swimming the backstroke leg of the relay in 1:02.50. In the evening semifinals of the 50 metre backstroke, she finished in 28.69 seconds, ranking eighth overall and qualifying for the final. On the finals mixed medley relay later in the session, Pieter Coetze substituted in for her on the backstroke leg, and the relay placed fourth. On Day six, she placed eighth in the final of the 50 metre backstroke with a 28.66. Later in the finals session, she swam the backstroke portion of the 4×100 metre medley relay in 1:01.39, contributing to a fourth-place finish in a new African record and South African record time of 3:59.63.

Later in August, and following the Commonwealth Games, Meder achieved a personal best time and qualifying time for the 2022 World Short Course Championships in the 200 metre breaststroke with a 2:23.37 at the 2022 South Africa Short Course Championships.

2022 World Short Course Championships
On the first day of the 2022 World Short Course Championships, in Melbourne, Australia, Meder placed tenth in the 200 metre individual medley with a South African record time of 2:07.47, which broke a 13-year-old record in the event from Katheryn Meaklim at 2:07.54. Later the same day, she helped achieve thirteenth place in the 4×100 metre freestyle relay, anchoring the relay with a time of 54.19 seconds to a new African record time of 3:41.57. On The second day of competition, she split a 1:57.67 for the anchor leg of the 4×200 metre freestyle relay to help place tenth in a time of 8:04.85. On the morning of day three, she set a new African record in the 100 metre individual medley with a personal best time of 59.38 seconds and advanced to the semifinals ranked eighth. Later the same morning, she helped achieve an African record in the 4×50 metre freestyle relay, splitting a 25.14 for the second leg to contribute to the record time of 1:40.50 and an overall placing of eleventh. In the evening semifinals of the 100 metre individual medley, she lowered her African record mark to 58.98 seconds and qualified for the final ranking fifth.

On the morning of day four, Meder placed nineteenth in the 200 metre breaststroke with a time of 2:23.64. In the evening, she brought the African record in the 100 metre individual medley down to 58.46 in the final of the event, finishing less than one second behind gold medalist Marrit Steenbergen of the Netherlands to place sixth. On the fifth morning, she finished in a time of 58.04 seconds in the preliminaries of the 100 metre butterfly to place nineteenth. On The sixth and final day, she helped set a new African record in the preliminaries of the 4×100 metre medley relay in a time of 3:59.64, splitting a 57.68 for the butterfly leg of the relay to help finish in twelfth-place.

International championships (50 m)

International championships (25 m)

Personal best times

Long course metres (50 m pool)

Short course metres (25 m pool)

References

External links
 

2002 births
Living people
South African female swimmers
South African female freestyle swimmers
Swimmers at the 2020 Summer Olympics
Olympic swimmers of South Africa
21st-century South African women
Swimmers at the 2022 Commonwealth Games
Commonwealth Games competitors for South Africa